The Ceja Formation is a Pliocene to Pleistocene geologic formation exposed near Albuquerque, New Mexico.

Description 
The formation consists of weakly consolidated sandstone and conglomerate, varying in color from light yellowish-brown to reddish-yellow or pink. It consists of fluvial deposits with paleocurrent directions from the west. The lower beds are predominantly interbedded sandstone and mudstone while the upper beds are predominantly sandstone to conglomerate with occasional small boulders. The formation lies disconformably on the Arroyo Ojito Formation and its top beds are gravels capping the Llano de Albuquerque geomorphic surface. The lower beds sometimes contain white micritic carbonate pebbles interpreted as reworked caliche of the underlying Arroyo Ojito Formation.

Data from fossils and radioisotope measurements indicate that the formation is Pliocene in age. The data include an ash bed correlated to the 3.28 Ma Nomlaki Tuff. At Cat Mesa, the formation overlies a lava flow with a Ar-Ar age of 3.00 ± 0.01 Ma. A second flow within the formation has an Ar-Ar age of 2.68 ± 0.04 Ma. The formation is overlain by a third flow with a K-Ar age of 2.68 ± 0.04 Ma. A fossil pocket gopher is also consistent with a Pliocene age. Interbedded flows near Los Lunas give ages of  1.25 ± 0.02 Ma and 3.80 ± 0.04 Ma, extending the formation into the Pleistocene.

The formation is divided into the Atrisco Member, Rio Puerco Member, and Santa Ana Mesa member. This is overlain by the Rio Puerco Member.

The Santa Ana Mesa Member consists of reddish-brown sandstone and conglomerate conspicuous in the flanks of Santa Ana Mesa. It contains a 7.1 Ma pumice bed. The unit is typically redder than the other members of the Ceja Formation.

The Rio Puerco Member named for the Rio Puerco. It forms a very poorly sorted mesa-capping gravel along Ceja del Rio Puerco. It disconformably overlies the Atrisco Member to the north but interfingers with the Atrisco Member further south.

History of investigation 
The unit was first defined by V.C. Kelley in 1977 for beds formerly assigned to the upper buff member of the Santa Fe Formation (now the Santa Fe Group) by Kirk Bryan and Franklin T. McCann in 1936. S.D. Connell and coinvestigators reassigned the member to the Arroyo Ojito Formation in 1999.

In 2007, Williams and Cole recommended that the Arroyo Ojito Formation be abandoned, because the name was being used inconsistently and because the formation straddled a significant regional unconformity since named the Rincones paleosurface. They raised the Ceja Member, which lay above the Rincones paleosurface, to formation rank, a recommendation with which Connell subsequently concurred.

See also 
 List of fossiliferous stratigraphic units in New Mexico
 Paleontology in New Mexico

References

Bibliography 
 
 
 
 
 

Neogene formations of New Mexico
Pliocene Series of North America
Piacenzian
Zanclean
Messinian
Tortonian
Sandstone formations of the United States
Fluvial deposits